Brian James Fox is a drummer known for his work with White Tiger and as a member of Silent Rage.

White Tiger
Fox was recruited by lead guitarist and band leader Mark St. John, a former member of Kiss after being recommended to him by his guitar technician, and White Tiger bassist, Michael Norton.

Silent Rage
After the original White Tiger broke up, Fox joined the band Silent Rage, who themselves had a Kiss connection as the band's second album was signed to Gene Simmons's Simmons Records.  However, after 9/11, Fox rejoined Silent Rage for a special one-time-only performance when Silent Rage was asked to reunite to play at The Salvation Army Benefit Concert in November 2001 at the Galaxy Theater in Santa Ana, California.  This special benefit was organized and put on by Steve Brownlee who had signed Silent Rage for their debut album "Shattered Hearts."

Discography

With White Tiger
 White Tiger

With Silent Rage
  Don't Touch Me There (1989)
  Still Alive (2001)

References 

Living people
White Tiger (band) members
Year of birth missing (living people)
American heavy metal drummers